Héctor Murguía Lardizábal (born 13 March 1953 in Ciudad Juárez, Chihuahua) is a Mexican politician. He has been a Senator, Federal Deputy in the LXI Legislature and served as Mayor of Ciudad Juarez for 2004-2007 and 2010-2013.

Murguía graduated from the Monterrey Institute of Technology and Higher Education (ITESM), majoring in chemical engineering. In his twenties, from 1973 to 1975, he worked as a high school teacher at the Institute Tecnológico y de Estudios Superiores de Monterrey (ITESM), at Monterrey, Nuevo León. He later taught for a year (1978-1979) at the Universidad Autonóma de Ciudad Juarez, Mexico. Afterwards, he worked as the general manager of a bread factory. In 1978, he transferred back to Ciudad Juárez to work for a family-owned home improvement store, Maderería del Norte S.A. A year after, in 1979, he became the owner of a local manufacturing paint company, Química Industrial Fronteriza S.A. de C.V. (Pinturas Dekoro). 

In 1994 he was elected Senator of Chihuahua in conjunction with Martha Lara Alatorre, defeating the formula postulated by the National Action Party (PAN), headed by Luis H. Alvarez. He defeated Alvarez having the highest number of votes in any election in the state of Chihuahua.  

In 2004 he defeated the PAN candidate, Cruz Pérez Cuellar, in the race for mayor, making him the first PRI winning candidate in 12 years. During this term he constructed a peripheral ring road, Camino Real, which connected the north and south part of Ciudad Juarez benefitting over a million citizens in their commute to work. Further, his administration won national accolades for an energy project generating green energy from capturing methane gas from the city’s largest landfill.  Additionally, 30 community centers were inaugurated in the city’s poorest and most marginalized neighborhoods to reconstruct the social fabric.  In prior years, trash collection had been a major issue for the city of Juarez. During Murguia’s administration with the help of private organizations trash collection was made efficient and consistent. 

In December 15, 2009 he applied for leave as Federal Deputy to seek his party's nomination for Governor of Chihuahua, but Cesar Duarte Jaquez was nominated.

On March 10, 2010 he was nominated as the PRI's unity candidate for municipal president of City of Juárez. He was elected to a second term at the head of the city council in the elections of July 4, 2010, assuming office on October 10. During his term, one of his major accomplishments was bringing peace and security to the border city. From 2008 to 2010 Ciudad Juárez had occupied first place in the city with the highest homicide rates. During Mr. Murguia’s term his commitment and policies allowed for the homicide rate to decrease significantly from 3,000 a year to less than 300. Mr. Murguia’s administration was responsible for erecting the famous landmark “X” which was constructed as a tribute to Mexico’s president Benito Juarez. The X symbolizes the cross between two cultures the indigenous and the Spanish. The cross is also an Aztec religious symbol signifying the Fifth Sun.

Personal life
He is married to Patricia Holguín Cárdenas and is the father to three children, Hector (1985), Patricia (1987-2019), and Isabel (1989).

References 

Living people
1953 births
Institutional Revolutionary Party politicians
Members of the Senate of the Republic (Mexico)
Members of the Chamber of Deputies (Mexico)
Municipal presidents of Juárez
Monterrey Institute of Technology and Higher Education alumni
Politicians from Chihuahua (state)
People from Ciudad Juárez
20th-century Mexican politicians
21st-century Mexican politicians